Neapolitan means of or pertaining to Naples, a city in Italy; or to:

Geography and history
 Province of Naples, a province in the Campania region of southern Italy that includes the city
 Duchy of Naples, in existence during the Early and High Middle Ages
 Kingdom of Naples
 Kingdom of the Two Sicilies
 Neapolitan Republic (disambiguation), various entities
 Neapolitan War
 Naples, Florida, which took its designation from the Italian city

Music
 Music of Naples or Neapolitan dance
 Canzone Napoletana or Neapolitan song
 Neapolitan School of music
 Neapolitan chord (also known as Neapolitan sixth), the first inversion of a major chord built on the lowered second (supertonic) scale degree
 Neapolitan scale
 Neapolitan mass, a cantata-style mass

Food
 Neapolitan cuisine, a historical cuisine of Naples that date back to the Greco-Roman period to the modern days
 Neapolitan ice cream, a mixture of chocolate, vanilla, and strawberry ice cream side-by-side in the same container
 Neapolitan pizza, the original variety of pizza made according to strict rules
 Neapolitan ragù, one of the two most famous varieties of meat sauces and a speciality of Naples
 Neapolitan sauce, a basic tomato-based sauce derived from Italian cuisine
 Neapolitan wafer, an Austrian wafer and chocolate-cream sandwich biscuit
 Neapolitans (chocolate), individually wrapped square/rectangular pieces of chocolate

Other
 Neapolitan language, the language of southern continental Italy, named after the Kingdom of Naples
 Neapolitan piastra, a currency of the mainland part of the former Kingdom of the Two Sicilies
 Neapolitan horse, an extinct horse breed formerly bred in Naples
 Neapolitan Mastiff, a large, ancient breed of dog
 Neapolitan Novels, a four-part series by Elena Ferrante

See also
 
 
 Napolitan (disambiguation), various meanings including the name of a pasta dish, which is popular in Japan
 Nápoles

Language and nationality disambiguation pages

es:Napolitano